Sirpur (U) is a village and a mandal in Komaram Bheem district in the state of Telangana in India.

A Sri Shirdi Sai Baba temple is located in Sirpur (U).

Divisions
There are eleven gram panchayats in Sirpur (U) Mandal.

 Chorpalle
 Kanchanpalli
 Kothapalli
 Lingapur
 Mahagaon
 Mamidipalli
 Netnur
 Pangidi
 Phullara
 Shettihadapnur
 Sirpur (U)
Sirpur

References 

Villages in Komaram Bheem district
Mandals in Komaram Bheem district